The Billboard Latin Music Award for Digital Song of the Year (formerly Latin Digital Download of the Year) is an honor presented annually at the Billboard Latin Music Awards, a ceremony which honors "the most popular albums, songs, and performers in Latin music, as determined by the actual sales, radio airplay, online streaming and social data that informs Billboards weekly charts." The award is given to the best performing singles on Billboards Latin Digital Songs chart, which measures the best selling Spanish-language recordings in the United States. The list was established by the magazine on January 23, 2010.

Daddy Yankee, Don Omar, Enrique Iglesias, and Nicky Jam are the most awarded acts in the category with two wins each. All of them have won twice in a row. As of 2019, the holder is Daddy Yankee for the song "Dura".

Recipients

Records

Most nominations

Most awards

References

Awards established in 2010
Billboard Latin Music Awards
Song awards
2010 establishments in the United States